William George Lathrop (August 12, 1891 – November 20, 1958) was a pitcher in Major League Baseball. He played for the Chicago White Sox.

References

External links

1891 births
1958 deaths
Major League Baseball pitchers
Notre Dame Fighting Irish baseball players
Chicago White Sox players
Baseball players from Wisconsin
People from Rock County, Wisconsin